"Don't Come Home Too Soon" was a single released by Scottish band Del Amitri to mark the Scottish football team's qualification for the 1998 World Cup in France. The single reached No. 15 in the UK Singles Chart and topped the Scottish Singles Chart in June 1998.

Reception
The song received a mixed critical reception. Despite this, the single topped the Scottish Singles Chart for the week of 7 June 1998. On the UK Singles Chart the same week, the song debuted at No. 15, its peak position.

Charts

References

External links
 

1998 singles
Del Amitri songs
1998 songs
1998 in Scotland
Number-one singles in Scotland
Football songs and chants
Scotland national football team songs
Scottish songs
Scotland at the 1998 FIFA World Cup